Early to Bed is a 1933 British-German romantic comedy film directed by Ludwig Berger and starring Heather Angel, Fernand Gravey and Edmund Gwenn.

Production
The film was made as a co-production between the German giant UFA and Gaumont British. As was common at the time, the film was made as a multiple-language production with three separate versions modelled on the German original I by Day, You by Night. Early to Bed was made at the Babelsberg Studio in Berlin, along with the French and German versions. Robert Stevenson acted as a supervisor. The casting of the comedian Sonnie Hale in a supporting role, slanted the British version in a more humorous direction than its counterparts.

Synopsis
A young waiter and a manicurist share the same room without ever meeting – because she works in the day and he at night.  They encounter each other for the first time, and fall in love, without realising that they are already roommates.

Cast
 Heather Angel as Grete 
 Fernand Gravey as Carl 
 Edmund Gwenn as Kruger 
 Sonnie Hale as Helmut 
 Donald Calthrop as Peschke 
 Lady Tree as Widow Seidelblast 
 Athene Seyler as Frau Weiser 
 Jillian Sand as Trude 
 Leslie Perrins as Mayer 
 Lewis Shaw as Wolf 
 Comedian Harmonists as Themselves

References

Bibliography
Bergfelder, Tim & Cargnelli, Christian. Destination London: German-speaking emigrés and British cinema, 1925–1950. Berghahn Books, 2008.
Hardt, Ursula. From Caligari to California: Erich Pommer's life in the International Film Wars. Berghahn Books, 1996.
Kreimeier, Klaus. The Ufa Story: A History of Germany's Greatest Film Company, 1918–1945. University of California Press, 1999.

External links

1933 films
1933 musical comedy films
British musical comedy films
German musical comedy films
German multilingual films
British multilingual films
Films directed by Ludwig Berger
Operetta films
Films shot in Germany
Films of the Weimar Republic
British black-and-white films
Films produced by Erich Pommer
Films with screenplays by Hans Székely
1930s romantic musical films
Films shot at Babelsberg Studios
1933 multilingual films
1930s English-language films
1930s British films
1930s German films